The list of Western Australia Legislative Council by-elections includes every by-election held in the Australian state of Western Australia for the Legislative Council. Prior to the Acts Amendment (Electoral Reform) Act 1987 which came into force at the 1989 election, it was necessary for a by-election to be held to fill any vacancy; they have since been filled by recounts from the previous poll based on a proportional voting system. An imminent Council election often allowed the vacancy to remain until the inauguration of the new Council, usually on the following 22 May.

Ministerial by-elections

Until a constitutional amendment in 1947, it was necessary for members who were appointed as a Minister to resign their seat and contest their seat at a ministerial by-election. This was because the Ministers became members of the Executive Council, which reported to the Governor of Western Australia and was therefore deemed an "office of profit" under the Crown. Most ministerial by-elections were a formality with the Minister being re-elected unopposed, but on one occasion, in 1901, a Minister from the Council was defeated at the by-elections.

List of Legislative Council by-elections

1950–1989

1940–1949

The changes of names of electoral provinces at the 1950 election, effected by the Electoral Districts Act 1947, were as follows:

 Central Province → Midland Province
 East Province → Central Province
 Metropolitan-Suburban Province → Suburban Province
 South Province → South-East Province
 South-East Province → South Province

See also
 List of Western Australian state by-elections

References

External links
 
 
 

Western Australian Legislative Council by-election

Legislative Council by-elections
Western Australian Legislative Council